The 2022–23 Q Tour is a series of snooker tournaments to take place during the 2022–23 snooker season. The Q Tour is the second-tier tour, run by the World Professional Billiards and Snooker Association, for players not on the main World Snooker Tour.

A series of six events were played with the leading money-winner gaining a place on the main tour for the 2023–24 snooker season. The 16 highest-ranked players who had not already got a place on the main tour for the 2023–24 season, gained entry to a further event, the WPBSA Q Tour Playoff, the winner of which also gets a place.

Martin O'Donnell won two of the six events to be the leading money-winner and gain a place on the tour. Ashley Carty won the playoff to gain the second place.

Format 
Except for the playoff, events will be played over three days. The first day is an open qualifying day with 16 places available. The main draw starts on the second day when the 16 qualifiers are joined by the 48 seeded players who qualify based on their rankings in the 2021 Q School Order of Merit to make a first round field of 64 players. There are 3 rounds on the second day and a further three on the final day, to determine the winner of the event. The 48 who qualify directly include the top 32 eligible players from the 2022 UK Q School Order of Merit, the top eight from the 2022 Asia-Oceania Q School Order of Merit, and the eight highest ranked junior players not already qualified.

Prize fund 
Each event features a prize fund of £12,000 with the winner receiving £2,500.

 Winner: £2,500
 Runner-up: £1,200
 Semi-final: £750
 Quarter-final: £550
 Last 16: £275
 Last 32: £150
 Total: £12,000

Schedule 

The schedule for the six regular events and the playoff is given below.

Rankings 
Below are listed the leading players in the prize money rankings. Players on equal points were ranked by "countback", with the player having won the most prize money in the latest event played being ranked higher.

Event 1 
The first event took place at North East Snooker Centre, North Shields, from 2 to 4 September 2022. Ross Muir beat George Pragnell 5–2 in the final. Muir lost just five frames in the six rounds of the event. The final-day results are given below.

Event 2 
The second event took place at Castle Snooker Club, Brighton, from 16 to 18 September 2022. Martin O'Donnell beat George Pragnell 5–1 in the final, having won his quarter and semi-final matches in the deciding frame. The final-day results are given below.

Event 3 
The third event took place at the Delta Moon Club, Mons, Belgium from 14 to 16 October 2022. Farakh Ajaib beat Harvey Chandler 5–3 in the final. Chandler took a 2–0 lead before Ajaib won the next four frames, with a 45 clearance in frame 6 after Chandler had made a break of 60. The final-day results are given below.

Event 4 
The fourth event took place at the Snookerhallen Club, Stockholm, Sweden from 25 to 27 November 2022. Billy Castle beat Andrew Higginson in the deciding frame of the final, on a re-spotted black. The final-day results are given below.

Event 5 
The fifth event took place at Landywood Snooker Club, Walsall, from 9 to 11 December 2022. Daniel Wells beat Sydney Wilson 5–2 in the final. Wells lost the first three frames of his semi-final against Michael Georgiou, but won the next four to reach the final. The final-day results are given below.

Event 6 
The sixth event took place at the Northern Snooker Centre, Leeds, from 6 to 8 January 2023. The final was between Ross Muir and Martin O'Donnell. Both had won a Q Tour event earlier in the season and the points situation was such that the winner of the match would head the rankings and gain a place on the main tour for the following season. In the final O'Donnell won the opening frame with a break of 142 and went on to win the match by five frames to one. The final-day results are given below.

Playoff 
The final event, the WPBSA Q Tour Playoff, is being held at the Q House Snooker Academy in Darlington on 4 and 5 March. The event sees the 16 highest ranked players, excluding the player already qualified for the main tour, compete for a further place on that tour. Daniel Wells withdrew on medical grounds and was replaced by Florian Nüßle. Two rounds will be played each day with matches over 7 frames except for the final which will be over 9 frames. The draw was seeded, based on the final rankings. Ashley Carty beat Florian Nüßle 5–2 in the final. Carty lost the first three frames in his opening match against Farakh Ajaib but recovered to win 4–3. He was two frames down in his semi-final match against top seed Ross Muir but again won four frames in a row to win 4–2.

References 

Q Tour
Q Tour
Q Tour